John-Patrick Smith was the defending champion but decided not to participate. 
Jack Sock won the title, beating Bradley Klahn 6–4, 6–2.

Seeds

Draw

Finals

Top half

Bottom half

References
 Main Draw
 Qualifying Draw

Nielsen Pro Tennis Championship - Singles
2013 Singles